Stein Barth-Heyerdahl (12 July 1909 – 1972) was a Norwegian art painter and Nazi. A reluctant member of Nasjonal Samling (NS) briefly after its founding in 1933–34 and from 1941, he was mostly active in the National Socialist Workers' Party of Norway (NNSAP) during the 1930s. He was editor of the short-lived NNSAP-paper Nasjonalsocialisten in 1934–35. Barth-Heyerdahl lived in Berlin for extended periods during World War II, and became part of the circle around the NS-critical periodical Ragnarok, which espoused pan-German and neopagan ideologies. Along with Per Imerslund, he was one of Norway's strongest proponents of racialist pagan ideas.

References

Further reading
 Emberland, Terje: Religion og Rase: Nyhedenskap og Nazisme i Norge 1933-1945. Humanist Forlag AS 2003. 
 Emberland, Terje and Roughthvedt, Bernt: Det ariske idol. Aschehoug, 2004. 

1909 births
1972 deaths
20th-century Norwegian painters
Nazis from outside Germany
Norwegian modern pagans
Norwegian newspaper editors
Members of Nasjonal Samling
Norwegian expatriates in Germany
Date of death missing
Modern pagan artists
Adherents of Germanic neopaganism